Hypocrita calida is a moth of the family Erebidae. It was described by Felder and Rogenhofer in 1874. It is found in Colombia.

References

Hypocrita
Moths described in 1874